Charalampos Ikonomopoulos (born 9 January 1991) is a Greek professional footballer who plays as a centre-back.

Career

Aris
Ikonomopoulos is a professional player of Aris from 2009, when the Aris' coach, Mazinho, showed his faith to him. He made his professional debut in the match against Asteras Tripolis in Kleanthis Vikelidis stadium n 90' minute, when coach at the team, was Hector Raul Cuper.

Career statistics

References

External links
Scoresway.com Profile
Μyplayer.gr Profile

1991 births
Living people
Greek footballers
Super League Greece players
Aris Thessaloniki F.C. players
Vyzas F.C. players
Olympiacos Volos F.C. players
Association football midfielders
Panelefsiniakos F.C. players
Association football fullbacks
Footballers from Elefsina